Sandys may refer to:

 Sandys (surname), an Anglo-Saxon surname, including a list of people with the name
 Sandyston Township, New Jersey
 Sandys Row Synagogue, London
 Sandy's, a fast-food restaurant
 Sandys Wason, early 20th-century curate of Cury, Cornwall

See also 
 Baron Sandys
 Sandys baronets
 Sandys Parish, Bermuda
 Sandy (disambiguation)